The eastern rosella (Platycercus eximius) is a rosella native to southeastern Australia, including Tasmania.

It has been introduced to New Zealand where feral populations are found in the North Island (notably in the northern half of the island, Taranaki, Waikato and in the Hutt Valley) and in the hills around Dunedin in the South Island.

Taxonomy
The eastern rosella was named by George Shaw in 1792. It is sometimes considered a subspecies of the pale-headed rosella (P. adscitus). The term 'white-cheeked rosella' has been used for a species or superspecies combining the pale-headed and eastern forms.  Hybrids of the two taxa have been recorded where their ranges meet in northeastern New South Wales and southeastern Queensland. However, a mitochondrial study published in 2017 found that the eastern rosella was the earlier offshoot of the lineage that split into the pale-headed  and northern rosellas, and that nonsister taxa were hence able to hybridise.

Three subspecies of eastern rosella are recognised:
 P. e. eximius, Victoria and southern New South Wales. Black feathers on the back have green margins. Rump is pale green.
 P. e. elecica, northeast New South Wales and southeast Queensland. In the male the black feathers on the back have golden-yellow margins, and greenish-yellow in the female. The rump is bluish-green. This subspecies is also called the golden-mantled rosella, often abbreviated to GMR.
 P. e. diemenensis, eastern Tasmania. White cheek patches are larger and the red on the head is darker.

Description

It has a red head and white cheeks. The beak is white and the irises are brown. The upper breast is red and the lower breast is yellow fading to pale green over the abdomen. The feathers of the back and shoulders are black, and have yellowish or greenish margins giving rise to a scalloped appearance that varies slightly between the subspecies and the sexes. The wings and lateral tail feathers are bluish while the tail is dark green. The legs are grey. The female is similar to the male though duller in colouration and has an underwing stripe, which is not present in the adult male. Juveniles are duller than females and have an underwing stripe.
The diet of eastern rosellas mainly consists of fruit, seeds, flowers and insects.

Distribution and habitat

The natural range of the eastern rosella is eastern Australia, including Tasmania. The species is found in lightly wooded country, open forests, woodlands, gardens, bushlands and parks.

The eastern rosella (Platycercus eximius) has become naturalised in New Zealand. By the 1970s the population, probably originally from cage escapees, was strongly established throughout Auckland, Northland, and the far north, extending into west Waikato, as far south as Kawhia and Te Kuiti, and east to the Coromandel Peninsula. The species is also found in the Wellington-Hutt Valley Region, established in the 1960s from escaped cage birds, later colonising the foothills of the Tararua Range, to Eketahuna in the east, and Ōtaki in the west (range up to 1985). There have been sightings in New Plymouth, Taupo, Gisborne, Tiritea, Banks Peninsula, Nelson area, and Stewart Island. The first occurrence of these parrots in New Zealand was about 1910 when a small shipment of eastern rosellas, as well as a few crimson rosellas (P. elegans), that had been refused entry into New Zealand by the Customs Department was released off Otago Heads by the ship that brought them, as she was returning to Sydney. The two species crossed, and by 1955 no pure crimson rosellas remained in the Dunedin area. The population of rosellas in Dunedin has always remained low, partially due to them being trapped and sold as caged birds.

Breeding

Eastern rosellas usually breed in spring but if needed summer as well. They can have two to nine eggs. The sign the eastern rosella mostly shows that they would be breeding is that they give food to each other.

Gallery

References

Further reading

External links

eastern rosella
Feral parrots
Broad-tailed parrots
Birds of New South Wales
Birds of Victoria (Australia)
Birds of Tasmania
Endemic birds of Australia
eastern rosella
Taxa named by George Shaw